Imko Binnerts can refer to
 Imko Binnerts - head chef, formerly been awarded a Michelin star for the restaurants Excelsior, Imko's and Imko Binnerts (restaurant) 
 Imko Binnerts (restaurant) - former Michelin starred restaurant